Pafsanias Katsotas (1896 – 14 February 1991) was a Hellenic Army general and politician.

Biography
Katsotas was born in the village of Stamna in Aetolia-Acarnania in 1896. He graduated from the Hellenic Army Academy in 1916 as an Infantry 2nd Lieutenant, and served in the Army until his voluntary retirement in 1929. Following the outbreak of the Greco-Italian War in 1940, he was recalled to service, and fought in the Albanian front as a regimental commanding officer with the rank of lieutenant colonel. Following the German invasion of Greece in April 1941, he fled the country and joined the forces of the Greek government in exile in the Middle East. He assumed command of the 1st Greek Infantry Brigade, with which he fought in the Second Battle of El Alamein.

After the liberation of Greece in 1944, he became Minister of Public Order in the short-lived cabinet of Panagiotis Kanellopoulos (November 1945), and head of the Athens Military Command. He retired again in 1946, and ran successfully for a seat in the Hellenic Parliament in the March 1946 elections, representing his native Aetolia-Acarnania. In 1949, during the last stages of the Greek Civil War, he was again recalled to service and appointed as head of the Central Greece Military Command. He retired in 1950 with the rank of Major General.

He was again elected to Parliament in the March 1950 elections. He became Minister of the Interior in the cabinet of Sofoklis Venizelos (March–April 1950), and Minister-Governor of Northern Greece in the Nikolaos Plastiras cabinet (May–August 1950). In 1954, he was elected Mayor of Athens, a post he occupied with minor interruptions until 1959. In 1960, Katsotas founded his own political party, the "Labour-Technical Party" (Εργατοτεχνικό Κόμμα), which in 1961 joined Georgios Papandreou's Centre Union. In February–June 1964, Katsotas served as Minister of Social Welfare in Papandreou's cabinet.

He last took part in the 1977 elections as part of the National Alignment ticket. Katsotas died in 1991.

Awards
Katsotas was decorated with the Grand Commander of the Order of George I and of the Order of the Phoenix with Swords. He also received the Gold Cross of Valour twice and the War Cross four times.

References

1896 births
1991 deaths
20th-century Greek people
Hellenic Army major generals
Greek military personnel of World War II
Mayors of Athens
Grand Commanders of the Order of George I
Recipients of the Order of the Phoenix with Swords (Greece)
Recipients of the Cross of Valour (Greece)
Recipients of the War Cross (Greece)
Knights Commander of the Order of Merit of the Federal Republic of Germany
Greek MPs 1946–1950
Greek MPs 1950–1951
Ministers of the Interior of Greece
Centre Union politicians
People from Aetolia-Acarnania